The 2008 Munster Senior Hurling Final was a hurling match played on 13 July 2008 in the Gaelic Grounds, Limerick. It was contested by Tipperary and Clare. Tipperary claimed their first Munster Senior Hurling title since 2001 and 37th title overall as they overcame Clare by a score of 2–21 to 0–19.
Goals in either half from Séamus Callinan (1-3) and John O'Brien (1-4) helped the National League champions to an eight-point win.
With a first half wides tally of 10, Clare struggled initially in defence and attack and were 1–11 to 0-6 behind at half-time. Aided by Niall Gilligan's 0-8 haul Clare revived their chances by closing the gap to five points but O'Brien's 58th-minute goal sealed the issue.
Playing captain Eoin Kelly and team captain Paul Ormonde collected the munster cup after the final whistle.

The match was screened live by RTÉ as part of The Sunday Game programme.

By winning the final Tipperary maintained their unbeaten run in 2008 under Liam Sheedy in his first year as manager.

Match details

References

External links
 RTÉ Match Report

Munster
Munster Senior Hurling Championship Finals
Clare county hurling team matches
Tipperary county hurling team matches